Willie James Young Jr. (born September 19, 1985) is a former American football defensive end and outside linebacker. He was drafted by the Detroit Lions in the seventh round of the 2010 NFL Draft. He played college football at NC State.

Early life
Young was born on September 19, 1985 in Riviera Beach, Florida. He attended Palm Beach Gardens Community High School, where he played basketball and football as a defensive lineman and ran track. As a junior in 2003, he recorded 60 tackles including 15 for loss and nine quarterback sacks. As a senior, he recorded 65 tackles including 25 for loss and 12 sacks. Scout.com rated him a three-star college prospect, and he accepted a scholarship offer from NC State. Young has a younger brother named Avery Young who plays offensive tackle for the Tampa Buccaneers of the National Football League (NFL).

College career
Young attended North Carolina State University, from which he received a bachelor's degree in science and technology. He sat out the 2005 season on redshirt status. In 2006, he played in all 12 games including five starts and recorded 44 tackles, of which 24 were solo, and five for loss, one pass broken up, five quarterback hurries, and one interception returned 34 yards for a touchdown. In 2007, he saw action in all 12 games including eight starts. He recorded 16 tackles for loss, 24 quarterback hurries, and broke up six passes. In 2008, he started 12 games and recorded 12.5 tackles for loss, 6.5 sacks, and 26 quarterback hurries. The NFL Draft Scout rated Young the 18th-ranked defensive end of the 182 available for the 2010 NFL Draft and projected him as a fifth or six round selection.

Professional career

2010 NFL Draft
Young was selected by the Detroit Lions in the seventh round with the 213th overall pick in the 2010 NFL Draft.

Detroit Lions
Young spent his rookie season inactive for all but 2 games. He played 14 games in the 2011 season.

 In 2013, Young gained media attention after taunting the New England Patriot's quarterback, Tom Brady. In the second quarter of a pre-season game, Young helped force Brady to throw an incomplete pass. After the play, Young grabbed Brady's jersey and stuck his finger in the quarterback's face. As a result, a 15-yard penalty was thrown. In addition, Young was also benched after the play.

Chicago Bears
On March 13, 2014, Young signed a three-year, $9 million contract with the Chicago Bears to be a backup behind Lamarr Houston and Jared Allen. 
In Week 1 against the Buffalo Bills, Young notched his first sack of his Bears season in the Bears 20-23 overtime loss. In Week 2 against the San Francisco 49ers, Young notched 2 more sacks on Colin Kaepernick. In Week 3, he continued to rush the quarterback with success against the New York Jets, sacking Geno Smith once in the Bears' 27-19 victory. In Week 4, Willie Young did not notch a sack for the first time in his Bears career, although he did block a Mason Crosby kick. In Week 5 at the Carolina Panthers, he sacked Cam Newton once, although the Bears lost the game 24-31. In Week 6 against the Atlanta Falcons, he notched 2 more sacks in a Bears 27-13 victory over the Falcons. Unfortunately, the Chicago Bears defensive unit had increased injury and performance issues throughout the year which led to decreased production as a whole. Young went on to gain three more sacks throughout the season against the Minnesota Vikings, Dallas Cowboys, and New Orleans Saints. Willie Young ended the season with a career-high and team high 10 sacks.

With the Bears switching to a 3-4 base, Young was converted to outside linebacker in 2015. He recorded a sack in five consecutive games (weeks eleven to fifteen), the third player in franchise history to do so after Steve McMichael and Brian Urlacher.
 
On July 30, 2016, Young agreed to a two-year contract extension.

On October 10, 2017, Young was placed on injured reserve after suffering a torn triceps.

On February 28, 2018, Young was released by the Bears.

References

External links
Chicago Bears bio
Detroit Lions bio
NC State Wolfpack bio

1985 births
Living people
People from Riviera Beach, Florida
African-American players of American football
Players of American football from Florida
Sportspeople from the Miami metropolitan area
NC State Wolfpack football players
American football defensive ends
American football outside linebackers
Detroit Lions players
Chicago Bears players